Bonino da Campione was an Italian sculptor in the Gothic style, active between 1350 and 1390.

His name indicates that he was born in - or into a family originating in - Campione d'Italia, a Lombardy town in an enclave within Switzerland. His works include:
the tomb of bishop Balduino Lambertini (1349) in the Old Cathedral in Brescia
a monument to Folchino de'Schizzi (1357) in Cremona Cathedral
the tomb of Saint Homobonus (now lost)
one of the tombs for the Visconti family in the Basilica of Sant'Eustorgio in Milan
an equestrian monument of Bernabò Visconti (1363), now in the Museum of Ancient Art at Castello Sforzesco, Milan
the monument to Cansignorio della Scala (1374) at Santa Maria Antica, Verona.
miniature sculpture of Madonna with Child Madonna Litta (1370–75), now located in the Museum of Ancient Art at Castello Sforzesco, Milan

External links

Bonino da Campione Sculptures at Art Renewal Center

References

Gothic sculptors
14th-century Italian sculptors
Italian male sculptors
Campione d'Italia